Luthers Mills is a village in Burlington Township, Bradford County, Pennsylvania, United States. The village is located east of the borough of Burlington and north of U.S. Route 6. Luthers Mills and Highland are the only villages in Burlington Township.

Notable person
Roger A. Madigan (1930-2018), Pennsylvania State Senator and Representative

References

Unincorporated communities in Pennsylvania